Peel ministry may refer to:

 Wellington–Peel ministry, the British government under the Duke of Wellington and Sir Robert Peel (1828–1830)
 First Peel ministry, the British minority government led by Sir Robert Peel (1834–1835)
 Second Peel ministry, the British majority government led by Sir Robert Peel (1841–1846)